Manmohan Attavar ( 12 July 1932 - 12 December 2017) was an Indian horticulturist, plant breeder, writer and the founder of Indo American Hybrid Seeds (IAHS), an organization engaged in scientific plant breeding and horticulture. He founded the enterprise in 1965 and the organization, headquartered in Bengaluru, has grown to include 9 regional centres across India. He has served as a member of the Scientific Advisory Committee of the Ministry of Commerce and the Federation of International Seedsmen, Switzerland and has been a director of the National Horticultural Board. He has co-authored a book, Floriculture : technology, trades, and trends, which was published by Oxford and IBH Publishing House in 1994.

Attavar is a recipient of several awards such as Dr. M. H. Marigowda National Award, APEDA Award, Golden Jubilee International Award of the International Chrysanthemum Society, California and ISF Award. The Government of Karnataka awarded him the Rajyotsava Prashasthi in 1991. He received the Padma Shri, the fourth highest civilian award from the Government of India in 1998 for his contributions to the field of Horticulture.

Attavar was married to Mamtha who has since died, leaving him with their two children. Subsequent to her death, he donated a women's theatre block to CSI Lombard Memorial Hospital, Udupi and the hospital has named the facility as Martha Mamatha Attavar Memorial Block.

References 

Recipients of the Padma Shri in science & engineering
Scientists from Karnataka
Indian horticulturists
Recipients of the Rajyotsava Award 1991
Plant breeding
2017 deaths
20th-century Indian biologists
1932 births